Christopher Newton may refer to:

 Christopher Newton (born 1936),  Canadian director and actor
 Chris Newton (born 1973), British cyclist
 Christopher Newton (criminal) (1969–2007), American murderer